Chakkapan Phewngam (Thai: จักกพันธุ์ ผิวงาม) is a Thai politician, currently serving as a Deputy Governor of Bangkok. Phewngam previously served as Deputy Governor under Aswin Kwanmuang until his resignation in 2019 and as deputy city clerk.

Career 
Phewngam is charged with managing the Bangkok Metropolitan Administration's finances.

References 

Living people
Chakkapan Phewngam
Year of birth missing (living people)